Jack Cosgrove (born October 30, 1956) is an American football coach.  He is the head football coach at Colby College. Cosgrove served as  the head football coach at the University of Maine from 1993 to 2015.  He is an alumnus of Maine and played college football as a quarterback on the Maine Black Bears football team.  Prior to receiving the head coaching position as his alma mater, Cosgrove served as an assistant at Maine and Boston College and was head coach at Stoughton High School.

Head coaching record

References

External links
 Colby profile
 Maine profile

1956 births
Living people
American football quarterbacks
Boston College Eagles football coaches
Colby Mules football coaches
Maine Black Bears football coaches
Maine Black Bears football players
High school football coaches in Massachusetts
People from Sharon, Massachusetts
Coaches of American football from Massachusetts
Players of American football from Massachusetts